The enzyme 2-pyrone-4,6-dicarboxylate lactonase (EC 3.1.1.57, LigI) catalyzes the reversible hydrolytic reaction 

2-oxo-2H-pyran-4,6-dicarboxylate + H2O = (1E)-4-oxobut-1-ene-1,2,4-tricarboxylate

This enzyme belongs to the Amidohydrolase superfamily of enzymes and is a member of Cluster of Orthologous Groups (COG) 3618. The systematic name of this enzyme is 2-oxo-2H-pyran-4,6-dicarboxylate lactonohydrolase. This enzyme is found to play an important role in the metabolism of lignin-derived aromatic compounds in both the syringate degradation pathway and the protocatechuate 4,5-cleavage pathway.

LigI from Sphingomonas is of particular interest as it has been shown to be the first member of the amidohydrolase superfamily to not require a divalent metal cation for catalytic activity.

Mechanism 
The mechanism of catalysis of LigI has been determined by crystallography and NMR analysis. More specifically, the hydrolytic water molecule is activated by the transfer of a proton to Asp-248 whereas the carbonyl group of the 2-pyrone-4,6-dicarboxylate (PDC) lactone substrate is activated by hydrogen bonding interactions with His-180, His-31, and His-33.

References

Further reading 

EC 3.1.1
Enzymes of known structure